The Battle of Saint Kitts, also known as the Battle of Frigate Bay, was a naval battle fought on 25 and 26 January 1782 during the American Revolutionary War between a British fleet under Rear Admiral Sir Samuel Hood and a larger French fleet under the Comte de Grasse.

Background
When Hood returned to the West Indies in late 1781 after the Battle of the Chesapeake, he was for a time in independent command owing to Admiral George Rodney's absence in England. The French admiral, the Comte de Grasse, attacked the British islands of St Kitts and Nevis with 7,000 troops and 50 warships, including the 110-gun Ville de Paris. He started by besieging the British fortress on Brimstone Hill on 11 January 1782. Hoping to salvage the situation, Hood made for St Kitts by departing Antigua on 22 January with 22 ships of the line, compared to de Grasse's 36.

Action
The British fleet on 24 January consisted of 22 sail of the line, and was close off the southeast end of Nevis. They ran into and captured the French 16-gun cutter Espion, which carried a large amount of ammunition for the besieging French forces at Brimstone Hill.

At daybreak on 25 January, the French fleet was discovered having stood to the southward of Basseterre, consisting of a 110-gun ship, 28 two-decked ships, and two frigates. Hood stood towards the French fleet with the apparent intention of bringing on action, and effectively drew the French fleet off the land. As soon as Hood effected this maneuver, he was aided by a favorable change in wind and was able to guide his fleet within the anchorage of Basseterre, which the French admiral had just quit. Hood ordered his fleet in an L-formation and then ordered his fleet to lay anchor. De Grasse made three distinct attacks upon the British fleet on 26 January but was repulsed.

The Pluton, commanded by D'Albert de Rions, led the French line, "receiving the crashing broadside of ship after ship until the splintered planking flew from her off side and her rigging hung in a tangled mass." Chauvent goes on to describe the battle as "...a sulphurous hell, with cannon vomiting forth flame and death."  The entire battle lasted from 7:00 am to 6:30 pm, with the major action in the afternoon.

Aftermath

Damage on both sides was heavy, though the French suffered higher casualties. However, Hood was unable to stop the French and could only observe the land action. After the successful French siege of Brimstone Hill fortress, St Kitts and Nevis surrendered on 12 February.

Hood left on the 14th and joined forces with the recently arrived Admiral George Rodney.

Order of battle

Britain

France

References
Citations

Bibliography
 
 Clowes, William Laird., (1897) The Royal Navy: a history from the earliest time to the present, Volume 3
 Jaques, Tony Dictionary of Battles and Sieges: A-E Greenwood 2006 
 Marley, F. David. Wars of the Americas: A Chronology of Armed Conflict in the New World, 1492 to the Present ABC-CLIO (1998).

External links
 Buttrey Manuscript "Battle of St. Kitts - perhaps first hand account

Conflicts in 1782
Battle Saint Kitts 1782
Battle Saint Kitts
Battle Saint Kitts
Battle Saint Kitts 1782
Naval battles of the American Revolutionary War
Naval battles involving France
Naval battles involving Great Britain
History of British Saint Christopher and Nevis